The Rockefeller Building is a historic high-rise office building in downtown Cleveland, Ohio that was built in 1903-1905 and sits at the corner of West 6th and Superior Avenue across from the Tower City Center complex. The building stands at a height of 212 ft. (64.62 m), rising 17 stories above the street and is named after the Standard Oil of Ohio founder John D. Rockefeller.  The massively wide building acts as an entry point into the very popular and populated Warehouse District, Cleveland. In 1973, the building was put on the list of National Register of Historic Places.

There can never be any question that Rockefeller was instrumental in helping build Cleveland into the industrial powerhouse it still is today. There are many things in the city named after him including Rockefeller Park, The Rockefeller City Greenhouse,  and Rockefeller Avenue, however, his namesake building is the most lasting and most recognizable epitaph to the Cleveland billionaire.
Rockefeller was known for his generosity towards his native city, his legacy of giving and spending money on Cleveland projects and parks is still widely felt today.

What's in a name?

As can be seen in the adjacent picture, The ROCKEFELLER name is prominently displayed on  the  West 6th side of the building. This has been this way since 1905, except for a brief period when fellow Cleveland businessman Josiah Kirby (responsible for starting the gigantic Cleveland Discount Company  mortgage firm in 1921 in Cleveland), bought the skyscraper from the Rockefellers in 1920 and subsequently changed the facade to the Kirby Building. However, Josiah Kirby angered the Rockefeller family by doing so, thus the Rockefeller family bought the building back and reverted it to the ROCKEFELLER moniker in 1923. That signage is still very visible today, having changed little in design since 1923.

See also
List of tallest buildings in Cleveland, Ohio

References

Skyscraper office buildings in Cleveland
Buildings and structures in Cleveland
Office buildings completed in 1905
Downtown Cleveland
1905 establishments in Ohio